Göllheim is a Verbandsgemeinde ("collective municipality") in the Donnersbergkreis, in Rhineland-Palatinate, Germany. The seat of the Verbandsgemeinde is in Göllheim.

The Verbandsgemeinde Göllheim consists of the following Ortsgemeinden ("local municipalities"):

 Albisheim
 Biedesheim 
 Bubenheim 
 Dreisen 
 Einselthum
 Göllheim
 Immesheim 
 Lautersheim 
 Ottersheim 
 Rüssingen 
 Standenbühl 
 Weitersweiler 
 Zellertal

Verbandsgemeinde in Rhineland-Palatinate
North Palatinate